Eduardo Abeliuk (born in Santiago, Chile) is a Silicon Valley entrepreneur and technologist. He co-founded TeselaGen Biotech, a Synthetic Biology company based in San Francisco that emerged as a spin-off from the Lawrence Berkeley National Laboratory. He also founded ClassroomTV - an Educational technology company operating in Latin America - and KissMe, one of the early viral Facebook applications.

Education
Mr. Abeliuk holds a double bachelor's degree in Physics and in Electrical Engineering from University of Chile. He also holds a M.S. in Bioengineering and a Ph.D. in Electrical Engineering from Stanford University.

Career
Mr. Abeliuk is co-founder and CTO of TeselaGen Biotech, a San Francisco based company that has developed a technological platform for Synthetic Biology. TeselaGen is supported by the U.S. National Science Foundation. He also founded ClassroomTv, an early MOOC platform focusing on corporate online training.

During his PhD, he used computational biology techniques to predicted the existence of novel small RNA molecules, confirmed through biochemistry experiments by colleagues at Stanford. One of these RNA molecules, CrfA RNA, has been associated with carbon starvation. Abeliuk also co-developed a technique used to identify the essential genome of an organism by coupling high-throughput DNA sequencing with transposon mutagenesis. He was part of the Facebook Class at Stanford University, a group of computer scientists who created a series of successful Facebook applications. He co-founded KissMe in 2007, based on the group's first Facebook application to reach 1 million users after 4 weeks of being launched which was subsequently acquired.

Selected publications
 Landt S.G., Abeliuk E. (2012) A strategy for identifying noncoding RNAs using whole- genome tiling arrays. Bacterial Regulatory RNA (Editor: Keiler K). Methods in molecular biology series (Clifton, N.J.)
 Zhou B, Schrader JM, Kalogeraki VS, Abeliuk E, Dinh CB, Pham JQ, Cui ZZ, Dill DL, McAdams HH, Shapiro L, (2015). The global regulatory architecture of transcription during the Caulobacter cell cycle., PLoS Genet.
 Abeliuk E, Christen B, Fero MJ, Collier MJ, Kalogeraki V, Passarelli B, Coller JM, McAdams HH, Shapiro L. (2011) The essential genome of a bacterium. Journal of Molecular Systems Biology.
 Goley E.D., Yeh Y.C., Hong S.H., Fero M.J., Abeliuk E., McAdams H.H., and Shapiro L. (2011) Assembly of the Caulobacter cell division machine. Journal of Molecular Microbiology
 Britos L, Abeliuk E, Taverner T, Lipton M, McAdams H.H., Shapiro L. (2011) Regulatory Response to Carbon Starvation in Caulobacter crescentus. PLoS One.
 Landt S.G., Abeliuk E., McGrath P.T., Lesley J.A., McAdams H.H., Shapiro L. (2008) Small non-coding RNAs in Caulobacter crescentus. Journal of Molecular Microbiology.
 Srinivasan BS, Shah NH, Flannick JA, Abeliuk E, Novak AF, Batzoglou S. (2007) Current progress in network research: toward reference networks for key model organisms. Briefings in Bioinformatics.

References

External links
 Eduardo Abeliuk's homepage
"TeselaGen Is Building A Platform For Rapid Prototyping in Synthetic Biology", by  Kim-Mai Cutler "Techcrunch"
"How To Code A Life", by Allison McCann, "BuzzFeed"

Chilean emigrants to the United States
Living people
Year of birth missing (living people)